Vitello Productions, Inc., formerly called Vitello & Associates, Inc., is a company based in Burbank, California founded in 1984 that provides services for live action movies as well as cartoons, such as picture and sound editing.

Work

Anime dubs producer
Crayon Shin-chan - First 52-episode English dub, only aired in Europe and Latin America
Finding Paradiso - Sales pilot
Origami Warriors - Sales pilot

Post production producer
Popeye and Son
Garbage Pail Kids (TV series)
The New Adventures of Winnie the Pooh (select episodes in the first and second seasons)
The Cramp Twins
Mr. Bogus
Nine Dog Christmas
He's a Bully, Charlie Brown
Captain Simian & the Space Monkeys
Roswell Conspiracies: Aliens, Myths and Legends
Bruno the Kid

Picture editor
FantomWorks - reality television show

Sound effects
Voltron

Notes

Mass media companies established in 1984
 Entertainment companies established in 1984
1984 establishments in California
Anime companies
Mass media companies of the United States
Video production companies
Companies based in Burbank, California